CX 16 Radio Carve is a Uruguayan Spanish-language AM radio station that broadcasts from Montevideo.

History
It was founded in 1928 by a German immigrant, Karl Kärbe, who Hispanicized his name into Carlos Carve. In honor of the founder, the subsequent owners kept its original name.

Selected programs
 Amaneciendo con el campo (rural news).
 Americando (folklore).
 Fútbol por Carve (football).
 Inicio de jornada (news).
 Informativo Carve (news).
 Valor agregado (rural news).

References

External links
 
 850 AM

Spanish-language radio stations
Radio in Uruguay
Radio stations established in 1928
1928 establishments in Uruguay
Mass media in Montevideo
News and talk radio stations